Qatar Foundation for Education, Science and Community Development is a state-led non-profit organization in Qatar, founded in 1995 by then-emir Hamad bin Khalifa Al Thani and his second wife Moza bint Nasser. Qatar Foundation (QF), chaired by Moza bint Nasser, has spearheaded Qatar's endeavors to establish itself as a leader in education, science, and cultural development on both a regional and global scale.

According to the Qatar Foundation, its initiatives are oriented towards education, science and research, and community development. It has solicited a number of international universities to establish campuses in Qatar. The Qatar Foundation's activities have been characterized by critics as influence peddling or lobbying.

Education

K–12 education
In primary and secondary education, Qatar Foundation has several initiatives. Examples include establishing five Qatar Academy branches, opening Awsaj Academy, a school for children with learning difficulties, and opening Qatar Leadership Academy in collaboration with the Qatar Armed Forces. Furthermore, the foundation launched the Academic Bridge Program, a post-secondary school program that helps students transition from high school to university.

A major reform of the K–12 education system was embarked upon by Qatar Foundation in 2003, resulting in the formation of the RAND-Qatar Policy Institute and the subsequent publishing of the institute's assessment and recommendations in Education for a New Era: Design and Implementation of K-12 Education Reform in Qatar. As a response to declining standardized test scores, Qatar Foundation terminated its partnership with the RAND Corporation in 2013.

Higher education
In higher education, Qatar Foundation established branch campuses of eight international universities and one home-grown university at the main campus just outside Doha:
 1998 – Virginia Commonwealth University, with programs in art and design.
 2002 – Weill Cornell Medicine-Qatar opened, offering a two-year pre-medical program and a four-year medical program leading to an MD.
 2003 – Texas A&M University at Qatar opened, offering programs in chemical, electrical, petroleum, and mechanical engineering. In 2018, Qatar Foundation lawyers filed a lawsuit to block Texas A&M from releasing records about the foundation's donations.
 2004 – Carnegie Mellon University Qatar opened, offering programs in computer science, business, biological sciences, computational biology, and information systems.
 2005 – Georgetown University School of Foreign Service in Qatar opened, offering programs in international affairs. Nearly all of Georgetown University's foreign money donations stem from the Qatar Foundation.
 2008 – Northwestern University in Qatar opened, offering programs in journalism and communications.
2010 – Hamad Bin Khalifa University (HBKU) opened offering graduate programs in Islamic studies, humanities and social sciences, science and engineering, law, health and life sciences and public policy and undergraduate qualification in Computer engineering. HBKU is also the home of three national research institutes conducting mission driven research in energy and environment, computing, and biomedical. 
 2011 – HEC Paris in Qatar launched the first EMBA in the country.
 2011 – University College London Qatar opened, offering postgraduate qualifications in museum studies, conservation, and archaeology in partnership with Qatar Museums Authority.

These centers sit alongside the Qatar Faculty of Islamic Studies which began its first graduate classes in the 2007–2008 academic year. It offers master's degrees in Islamic finance, contemporary Islamic studies and Islamic public policy.

As part of the foundation's activities in education, it sponsors the World Innovation Summit for Education (WISE), which has been held in Doha since 2009.

US Education department investigated Georgetown University, Texas A&M, and Cornell and Rutgers over their funding from Qatar.

Science and research 
A program known as the Qatar Science Leadership Program was initiated in 2008 in order to help develop aspiring applied science students. In 2014, the program's first PhD scholar graduated from university. The majority of the universities on Qatar Foundation's campus run their own research programs, often collaborating with QF's own applied research bodies. In addition to the university programs, QF has formed international partnerships, including with the Royal Society and the James Baker Institute for Public Policy at Rice University.

Stars of Science, a reality TV show was launched in 2009 in order to discover "young Arab innovators". The show features Arab innovators who compete to transform ideas into marketable products. A cash prize of $1 million is awarded to the winner.

Research initiatives
The Qatar Foundation organizes the Qatar National Research Fund (QNRF), which was established in 2006. In 2007, a research division was established at Qatar Foundation to manage developing a scientific community in Qatar. It has hosted several international conferences in the fields of biotechnology, nanotechnology, and stem cell research.

The Qatar Science & Technology Park (QSTP), a research and development hub, was inaugurated in March 2009. At an investment of more than $800 million by Qatar Foundation, it became Qatar's first free-trade zone. In 2010, the Qatar Computing Research Institute (QCRI) was founded as a vehicle to conduct multidisciplinary applied computing research. Research topics include Arabic language computer technologies, computer security and data analysis.

Environmental initiatives
In the environmental sciences, Qatar Foundation founded the Qatar Green Building Council in 2009, and the Qatar Environmental & Energy Research Institute (QEERI).

Medicine initiatives
In 2012, the Qatar Biomedical Research Institute (QBRI) was established to develop translational biomedical research and biotechnology, focusing on diabetes, cancer and cardiovascular diseases. Another initiative launched by Qatar Foundation is the Sidra Medical and Research Center, which is reportedly the first hospital of its kind in the Middle East region. Endowed with $7.9 billion by Qatar Foundation, it is a large-scale project designed with upscale healthcare and education facilities intended to provide health services to the whole GCC region. After several delays, Sidra's hospital officially opened on 14 January 2018.

Community development 
Qatar Foundation's community development initiatives are based on three primary pillars. The first pillar mandates the "fostering of a progressive society". Secondly, "enhancing cultural life and protecting Qatar’s heritage" is enshrined in the foundation's community development policy. This goal is signified by the presence of the a sidra tree in the foundation's logo, a symbol associated with the Islamic Sidrat al-Muntaha and an evergreen tree, Ziziphus spina-christi, which is native to Qatar. The last pillar involves "addressing the community's immediate social needs". An example of an initiative designed to meet this goal is the Qatar Diabetes Association, which was incorporated in Qatar Foundation in order to raise public awareness of the rising rates of diabetes and assist in its management. Reuters has reported that the organization has made "commercial-looking investments."

Arts and culture initiatives

Al Shaqab, an equine education resource centre, became a member of Qatar Foundation in 2004. The institution is considered a testament to the historic role that horse racing and breeding played in Qatari culture. Facilities include a riding academy, an endurance training complex, and a centre for the breeding and showing of Arabian horses.

Al Jazeera Children's Channel (JCC) was launched in 2005 as a joint venture between Al Jazeera and Qatar Foundation with the aim of "preserving Arab cultural identity". With 90 percent of the channel being owned by Qatar Foundation, it broadcast from the foundation's Doha campus along with Baraem, the Arabic channel aimed at preschoolers. Al Jazeera announced in 2013 that it was in the process of acquiring full ownership of the channel.

In 2006, Qatar National Library (then known as Dar Al Kutub Library) became a member of Qatar Foundation. On November 19, 2012, Moza bint Nasser, chairperson of Qatar Foundation, announced plans for a new national library. Education City was chosen as the location of the new library. A notable attraction within the library is the Arab and Islamic Heritage section which contains a historic collection of books, periodicals, manuscripts, maps, and scientific instruments dating back to the 15th century. One of the largest online collections of historic records on the Persian Gulf countries was digitized in October 2014 and made available on the website of the Qatar Digital Library (QDL). The website was the culmination of a partnership established between Qatar Foundation, Qatar National Library, and the British Library in 2012.

The Qatar Philharmonic Orchestra was formed in 2007 at the behest of Qatar Foundation with an initial budget of $14 million. 

Qatar Foundation opened Mathaf: Arab Museum of Modern Art in December 2010 in association with Qatar Museums Authority.The museum holds one of the largest collections of sculptures and paintings by Arab artists in the world, and has published an online encyclopedia of Arab artists.

Msheireb Properties (a subsidiary of Qatar Foundation) initiated a $5.5 billion commercial development project in Doha in January 2010. Originally called "Heart of Doha", the project was renamed "Msheireb Downtown Doha" in reference to the historical name of the area.

Community initiatives 
The Qatar Diabetes Association, founded in 1995, became a member of Qatar Foundation in 1999. Its mission is to provide programs and services to assist the general public in the management and prevention of diabetes.

The Social Development Center was established in 1996 by Moza bint Nasser to organize community programs for Qatari families. It promotes the building of stable and self-sufficient families by offering workplace training and providing courses in financial management. Another cardinal goal of the center involves promoting Islamic social values.

Qatar Foundation established Reach Out To Asia (ROTA) – a charity initiative focused on assisting community development projects in Asian countries – in 2005. ROTA campaigns for education in developing countries. The organization has carried out activities in countries such as Pakistan, Indonesia, Lebanon, and Gaza.

In 2006, Moza bint Nasser founded The Doha International Family Institute (DIFI). The institute conducts research and promotes scholarship on the legal, sociological and scientific basis of the family as the fundamental unit of society. It has consultative status with the United Nations Economic and Social Council (UNECOSOC).

Events
The QatarDebate Center was established in 2007. In addition to organizing workshops and competitions with the intent of raising the standards of open discussion among Qatari students, the center also hosted the World Schools Debating Championship in 2010. Also launched in 2007 was the Qatar Career Fair (QCF), an annual event held at the Qatar National Convention Centre which showcases the range of career options available to Qatari students and graduates.

The Qatar National Convention Centre was inaugurated by QF in December 2011. It features a 2,300-seat auditorium.

Joint ventures 
Joint ventures in the fields of science and research, education and social development are deemed essential to Qatar's transition from an oil-based economy to a knowledge-based economy, as outlined in the Qatar National Vision 2030. Thus, the foundation has set up a number of commercial joint ventures with global partners. Profits generated are shared by both parties, with Qatar Foundation's portion being distributed into its core nonprofit activities.

The Qatar Foundation also managed two children's channels: Al Jazeera Children's Channel (later renamed to JeemTV) and Baraem. Up until 2016, they were co-owned by Al Jazeera Media Network and since then were acquired by beIN Channels Network

Fitch Qatar is a joint venture design company that creates brands and develops corporate identities for businesses and other organizations. It was jointly created by QF with Fitch London. Some of the company's clientele include the National Health Authority, the Qatar Museums Authority, and Barwa Group.

Qatar MICE Development Institute (QMDI) is a joint venture created with Singex Global to manage conferences, conventions, and other events. It was formed in 2007. One of the company's main areas of focus is the QF's Qatar National Convention Centre.

Vodafone entered in a partnership with QF to establish Vodafone Qatar in 2008. It was granted a fixed telecommunications in September 2008, thereby becoming the second mobile network operator to be licensed in the country. It officially launched its services in Qatar in March 2009.

Launched in November 2008, MEEZA is a joint-venture IT service provider catering to businesses. It was established to support Qatar's ICT sector amidst the country's population boom and technological transition. A major agreement was reached by Meeza in December 2015 stipulating the management of Maersk Oil's IT operations in Qatar.

Qatar Solar Technologies (QSTec) is an alternative energy company created in 2010 as part of a partnership between Qatar Foundation, SolarWorld and Qatar Development Bank. In December 2011, QSTec announced that it would be constructing a production plant in Ras Laffan Industrial City with a planned initial capacity of 4,000 metric tons of polysilicon every year. In August 2017, SolarWorld founder Frank Asbeck and QSTec bought out SolarWorld in a joint venture deal and rebranded it as SolarWorld Industries.

Bloomsbury Qatar Foundation Publishing (BQFP), launched in tandem with Bloomsbury Publishing, became the first publishing house to be established in Qatar in December 2008. It formerly published books in Arabic and English with the mission of promoting a culture of literacy throughout the region. It became defunct in December 2015 and all of its publications were incorporated in the newly established HBKU Press, a member of QF. At the time of BQFP's dissolution it had published over 200 books. Bloomsbury Qatar Foundation Journals (BQFJ), an open access, peer review academic publisher, was also incorporated in HBKU Press. BQFJ began publishing journal research articles through its website Qscience.com in December 2010, during the 2010 Qatar Foundation Annual Research Forum. The website maintained more than fifteen specialized and multidisciplinary journals in 2014.

Sponsorship
On 10 December 2010, FC Barcelona announced it had agreed a shirt sponsorship deal worth up to €170 million with Qatar Sports Investments to place Qatar Foundation's name on the front of the team's shirts, ending Barcelona's tradition of not accepting payment for sponsors displayed on its jersey. The deal included a clause allowing a switch in sponsor after the first two seasons, so Qatar Airways took over as the main sponsor in July 2013.

In October 2011, the Wikimedia Foundation announced a plan to work with the Qatar Foundation to support the growth of the Arabic Wikipedia. Later, the media reported that the Wikipedia page for the Qatar Foundation was allegedly edited by a public relations associate of the foundation, for which there was "strong, if circumstantial evidence". It was claimed by Qatar Foundation in November 2015 that the partnership had culminated in the creation of over 6,000 articles on the Arabic Wikipedia.

See also
Education City Stadium

References

External links
 

Educational organisations based in Qatar
Scientific organisations based in Qatar
Educational foundations
Organizations established in 1995
World Digital Library partners
1995 establishments in Qatar